Nicholas Michael Leddy (born March 20, 1991) is an American professional ice hockey defenseman for the St. Louis Blues of the National Hockey League (NHL). He was drafted in the first round, 16th overall, by the Minnesota Wild in the 2009 NHL Entry Draft. He previously played for the Chicago Blackhawks, New York Islanders and Detroit Red Wings. He won a Stanley Cup with the Blackhawks in 2013.

Playing career

Amateur
After a solid sophomore year at Eden Prairie High School, Leddy recorded 5 goals and 22 assists for a total of 27 points in his junior year. These numbers propelled Leddy to second-team all-Metro and earned him an honorable mention for all-state honors in Minnesota. The USA Hockey National Team Development Program (U.S. NTDP) and USA Hockey acknowledged Leddy as one of the best young players in the nation, but instead of heading to Ann Arbor, Michigan, to join the U.S. NTDP, Leddy chose to finish his high school career with his teammates, and returned to Eden Prairie for his senior year. Leddy posted 12 goals and 33 assists for a total of 45 points during that 2008–09 season, earning him the prestigious Minnesota "Mr. Hockey" award and the title of Metro Player of the Year by the Minneapolis Star-Tribune en route to a state title win over Moorhead High School. In addition, the Associated Press named Leddy to first-team all-state. Leddy was also awarded a position on the Class AA all-state tournament team.

As a freshman at the University of Minnesota in 2009–10, Leddy scored a power-play goal in a 6–1 rout of the University of British Columbia in his NCAA debut. However, shortly afterward, Leddy suffered a broken jaw against University of Alaska Anchorage on October 30, 2009. This injury caused Leddy to miss eight early-season games. When he returned to the lineup Leddy scored his first career goal in his second game back in a win at Minnesota State University on December 5, 2009. In early January 2009, Leddy collected an assist in each game of the Golden Gophers' rout of Harvard University, and soon followed up with two more assists against Alaska Anchorage later in the month. He was named WCHA Rookie of the Week after a three-point game against Colorado College on February 20, 2010, scoring the game-winning goal with two assists. Shortly after having his NHL draft rights traded from Minnesota to Chicago on February 12, 2010, Leddy heated up in February, tallying four assists, five points, 21 shots on goal and a plus-4 rating for the month. He carried that momentum into March, scoring yet another power-play goal against the University of Wisconsin on March 7, 2010. Leddy ultimately was named the team's Rookie of the Year after playing 30 games and ranking third among the team's defensemen in points with 11. He led the team in plus/minus (plus-6), all while maintaining excellent discipline on the ice: Leddy committed just two penalties all season. The Golden Gophers were 7–1 when Leddy had at least one point.

Professional

Leddy was drafted in the first round, 16th overall by the Minnesota Wild in the 2009 NHL Entry Draft. On February 12, 2010, the Minnesota Wild traded Leddy's NHL rights to the Chicago Blackhawks, along with Kim Johnsson in exchange for Cam Barker. University of Minnesota head coach Don Lucia stated in September 2009 that he foresaw Leddy spending at least two years in development with the Golden Gophers before making his transition to the NHL and a professional career. On July 27, 2010, it was reported by the Chicago Tribune that the Blackhawks had agreed to terms on a three-year, $2.7 million contract with defenseman Nick Leddy, who was to turn professional and leave the University of Minnesota after playing one season, according to his agent, Neil Sheehy. "[Leddy] is really smooth out there and I think he's going to be a Blackhawk for many years," Blackhawks general manager Stan Bowman said July 12 at the conclusion of the Hawks' Prospects Camp.

Leddy played his first NHL game on October 8, 2010, against the Colorado Avalanche and scored his first NHL goal on October 11 against Ryan Miller of the Buffalo Sabres. He was a member of the Blackhawks team that won the 2013 Stanley Cup. Shortly after the victory, Leddy signed a two-year contract extension with the club.

On October 4, 2014, Leddy was traded to the New York Islanders in exchange for Ville Pokka, T. J. Brennan and Anders Nilsson. On February 24, 2015, Leddy and the Islanders agreed to a seven-year, $38.5 million contract.

During the 2019–20 season, Leddy registered two goals in a 4-2 victory over the Ottawa Senators, including becoming the first Islanders defensemen in franchise history to score on a penalty shot on October 25, 2019.

Following the 2020–21 season, Leddy, with one year remaining on his contract, was traded by to the Detroit Red Wings in exchange for Richard Pánik and a second-round pick in the 2021 NHL Entry Draft.

On March 21, 2022, he was traded to the St. Louis Blues, along with Luke Witkowski, in exchange for Oskar Sundqvist, Jake Walman and a second-round pick in 2023 NHL Entry Draft. Leddy signed a four-year $16 million contract extension with the Blues on July 13.

International play

Leddy's high school and post-secondary career was supplemented with intermittent international play and development. He was a member of the U.S. squad in both the under-17 and under-18 Five Nations tournaments in the Czech Republic. In addition, Leddy participated in the 2009 U.S. under-18 evaluation camp in Lake Placid, New York, in association with USA Hockey and the USA Olympic team. Leddy had three goals and two assists in just five games at Lake Placid.

Career statistics

Regular season and playoffs

International

References

External links

 

1991 births
Living people
American men's ice hockey defensemen
Chicago Blackhawks players
Detroit Red Wings players
Ice hockey players from Minnesota
National Hockey League first-round draft picks
Minnesota Golden Gophers men's ice hockey players
Minnesota Wild draft picks
New York Islanders players
People from Eden Prairie, Minnesota
Rockford IceHogs (AHL) players
Sportspeople from the Minneapolis–Saint Paul metropolitan area
St. Louis Blues players
Stanley Cup champions